The 1982 Victorian state election, held on Saturday, 3 April 1982, was for the 49th Parliament of Victoria. It was held in the Australian state of Victoria to elect 81 members of the state's Legislative Assembly and 22 members of the 44-member Legislative Council.

Lindsay Thompson succeeded Rupert Hamer as Liberal Party leader and Premier on 5 June 1981, and John Cain Jr. replaced Frank Wilkes as Labor Party leader in September 1981. The incumbent Liberal government led by Lindsay Thompson was defeated by the Labor Party led by John Cain with a swing of 17 seats. The ALP returned to government in Victoria for the first time in 27 years.

Results

Legislative Assembly

Legislative Council

Seats changing hands

Members listed in italics did not recontest their seats.

Post-election pendulum

See also
Candidates of the 1982 Victorian state election

References

Elections in Victoria (Australia)
1982 elections in Australia
1980s in Victoria (Australia)
April 1982 events in Australia
John Cain